William Thomas "Bill" Barton (born February 18, 1933), was an American politician who was a Republican member of the Utah State Senate. A businessman, he attended the University of Utah and Utah Technical College.

References

1933 births
Living people
Republican Party Utah state senators
People from West Valley City, Utah
University of Utah alumni